Thornham is a village and civil parish in the English county of Norfolk.

The village's name means 'Thorn-tree homestead/village'.

For the purposes of local government, the parish falls within the district of King's Lynn and West Norfolk.

The Church of England parish church, dedicated to All Saints, is a Grade I listed building. , a Ham class minesweeper, was named after the village. The ship's bell hangs in All Saints' Church.

Notes

External links

Information from Genuki Norfolk on Thornham.

Villages in Norfolk
King's Lynn and West Norfolk
Populated coastal places in Norfolk
Civil parishes in Norfolk
Beaches of Norfolk